Dean Y. Li is the senior vice president of Discovery Sciences and Translational Medicine of Merck & Co. and president-elect of Merck Research Laboratories.

He graduated from University of Chicago and earned his MD and PhD from Washington University School of Medicine. He then joined University of Utah to do his post-doc with Mark Keating and joined the University of Utah Health Science Center as a professor of medicine and cardiology. At the University of Utah, he served as the vice dean for research and chief scientific officer for University of Utah Health Care. In 2017, he joined Merck as the vice president and head of translational medicine and was subsequently promoted to senior vice president, discovery sciences and translational medicine. In 2020, he was appointed president of Merck Research Laboratories to replace Roger M. Perlmutter.

At the University of Utah, he co-founded a number of biotechnology companies, including Recursion, Hydra Biosciences and Navigen Pharmaceuticals. He is a member of the American Society for Clinical Investigation and the Association of American Physicians.

References

Living people
Businesspeople in the pharmaceutical industry
Place of birth missing (living people)
Year of birth missing (living people)
Merck & Co. people
Washington University School of Medicine alumni
University of Chicago alumni
University of Utah School of Medicine faculty